Cisdnieper Railway (Prydniprovska zaliznytsia, PZ) is a regional operator of Ukrainian Railways in Southern Ukraine. Its headquarters are in Dnipro.

The PZ consists of four divisions – Dnipro Railway, Zaporizhia Railway, Kryvyi Rih Railway, and Crimea Railway. PZ's route map includes all the railroads in the Dnipropetrovsk and Zaporizhya oblasts (provinces) of Ukraine, and some of those in Kryvyi Rih, Kharkiv and Kherson oblasts. Access to railroads in the Autonomous Republic of Crimea has been suspended since 2014 due to annexation of Crimea by the Russian Federation.

As of 2008, PZ's rail system included  of track, of which 93.3% was electrified. There are 244 railway stations.

Main information
Cisdnieper Railways territory is mostly in Southern Ukraine. Administration is based in Dnipro. The operational length of the railroad was 3,255 km in 1990. The railroad is one of the oldest lines and was commissioned in 1884 as Yekaterinine Railways. In the 1890s it expanded by adding existing neighboring railway companies i.e. Donets–Black-coal Railways and parts of Kursk–Kharkiv–Azov Railways. In 1936–1961 it bore the name Stalin Railways.

The railway connects Donbas with Krivyi Rih iron pool two latitudinal lines Chaplyne — Synelnykove to Dnipro — Verkhivtseve — Piatykhatky and Kamysh-Zorya — Canopies — Zaporizhia — Apostolove — Krivyi Rih — Dymkove. The railroad serves the major industrial centers of Zaporizhia, Dnipro, Krivyi Rih, Pavlohrad, Nikopol, Novomoskovsk and others, and also agricultural areas.

Cisdnieper railway is characterised by a high share of departures and arrivals of goods. However, traffic roads relatively small NC small distance of transportation. In 1990, the turnover of the road amounted to approximately 88 000 000 000 t-km. In freight transportation is dominated by iron and manganese ores, coal, coke, ferrous metals, industrial goods, machinery, equipment, building materials, fluxes, grain. Tight supply transportation 27 000 000 t-km/km Intensive passenger traffic exists from Moscow, Donetsk, Odessa, South-West, North-Caucasus, October, Lviv Railways. The passenger turnover was (1990) 12 000 000 000 passenger-km. On Cisdnieper railway is well developed suburban passenger traffic (over 85% of all passengers), but because of the small range, the proportion of commuter traffic from the total turnover is about 25%.

During the World War II, the railroad was badly damaged. During the battles and the liberation of the territory from invaders, railroad workers carried out the supply to frontlines, the transport service, the restoration path and rolling stock. Thousands of railway workers participated in combat operations, worked in the underground. In the postwar years in the Cisdnieper railway Trade Union was not only restored, but also constructed, reconstructed, new stations, railway stations, artificial structures, including major bridges across the Dnieper. The main meridional direction Lozova–Zaporozhia transferred to electric traction; electrified main latitudinal direction and suburban areas. Electric traction is 77% of the total turnover, the rest is diesel. Up to 85% of the road sections equipped with automatic lock, up to 95% – electric interlocking of switches and signals. Built large marshaling yards, equipped with modern technical means of mechanization and automation. On loading and unloading operations are applied mechanization. High-performance track machines are used for current maintenance and repairs.

History
The idea of building a railway network near Dnipro city (at that time Yekaterinoslav) is credited to the first Russian minister of railways Pavel Petrovich Melnikov who in 1862 expressed an interest in connecting the city with Donets coal basin (Donbas).

Railway companies of Ukraine
Companies based in Dnipro
Rail transport in Dnipro